MS Milwaukee was a German diesel-powered, passenger ship built by Blohm & Voss and launched in February 1929 for the Hamburg-America Line. She was used on the  transatlantic service from Hamburg to New York and made cruises to the Canary Islands, Madeira and Spain sharing the same route as her sister ship . During the Second World War the ship was used as a barracks ship by the Kriegsmarine. In 1945, the ship was handed to the British government under the name Empire Waveney and was used to carry troops. On 1 March 1946, she was badly damaged by fire at dock in Liverpool.

She was scrapped in Scotland in 1947.

References

1929 ships
Cruise ships of Germany
Ships of the Hamburg America Line
Empire ships